HTC P3600 (codename Trinity) is a handheld PC by HTC Corporation.

Features include:
 Quad-band GSM/GRPS/EDGE
 Tri-band UMTS/HSDPA
 802.11b/g Wifi
 Bluetooth 2.0
 GPS
 Irda
 USB 1.1

Features
Communications
UMTS / HSDPA tri band: UMTS 850, UMTS 1900, UMTS 2100
GPRS / EDGE / GSM quad band: GSM 850, GSM 900, GSM 1800, GSM 1900
Integrated GPS

External links
HTC P3600
HTC Source news blog dedicated to HTC devices

P3600
Windows Mobile Professional devices
Mobile phones with infrared transmitter